Luis Pérez-Oramas (August 7, 1960 in Caracas) is a Venezuelan/American poet, art historian and curator. He is the author of nine poetry books, seven recollections of essays, as well as numerous art exhibition catalogues. He has contributed as Op Ed author to national newspapers in Venezuela (El Nacional and El Universal) as well as to various literary and art magazines in Latin America and Europe.

Early life 
He studied Comparative Literature in Caracas at the Andrés Bello Catholic University, graduating Summa Cum Laude after writing a thesis on the Mexican poet José Gorostiza. Later he pursued his studies in Philosophy and Art History in Toulouse and Paris (France), receiving a Ph.D from the Ecole des Hautes Etudes en Sciences Sociales (EHHSS, Paris) in 1994, under the direction of Louis Marin and Hubert Damisch, after completing his doctoral dissertation on Diego Velazquez.

He was member of Grupo Guaire, in Venezuela, and took part at the Taller Calicanto under the direction of the Venezuelan poet Antonia Palacios.

Career 
He taught Art History at the University of Rennes 2-Upper Brittany, the Ecole Supérieure de Beaux Arts de Nantes, and, after returning from France to his native Venezuela, at the Instituto Superior de Estudios Universitarios en Artes Plásticas Armando Reverón, Caracas. He has also taught at the Master Program in Museum Architecture and Museology at the Faculty of Architecture, Central University of Venezuela. Between 1994 and 2003 he was curator of the Patricia Phelps de Cisneros Collection, Caracas.

He has organized numerous art exhibitions in Venezuela, Brasil, Europe and the US. In 2011 he was appointed Curatorial Director of the XXXth São Paulo Biennial, which he organized under the title The Imminence of Poetics, an edition extremely well received both nationally and internationally. He worked as a curator at The Museum of Modern Art, New York, since 2003 where he held the position of Latin American Art curator between 2006 and 2017. He currently lives and works in New York as an independent curator, art consultant and writer.

Publications

Books – Poetry 
 Animal vesperal. Editorial Pre-Textos, Valencia, Spain, 2022.
 La mano segadora.Selección antológica (1983-2021). Fundación La Poeteca. Caracas, Venezuela, 2022.
 La dulce astilla. Editorial Pre-Textos, Valencia, Spain, 2015.
 Prisionero del Aire. Editorial Pre-Textos, Valencia, Spain, 2008.
 Gego: Anudamientos. Fundación Gego-Sala Mendoza, Caracas, 2004.
 Gacelas y otros poemas. Editorial Goliardos, Caracas, 1999.
 Doble siesta. Sixtus, Limoges, 1994.
 La Gana Breve.  Fondo editorial Pequeña Venecia, Caracas, 1992.
 Salmos y boleros de la casa.  Monte Avila Editores, Caracas, 1986.
 Poemas. Editorial Arte, Caracas, 1978.

Books – Art History and Criticism, Social Issues 
 La (in)actualidad de la pintura y vericuetos de la imagen. Editorial Pre-Textos, Valencia, 2021.
 Olvidar la muerte. Pensamiento del toreo desde América. Real Maestranza de Caballería de Ronda-Editorial Pre-Textos, Valencia, 2016.
 La República Baldía. Crónica de una falacia revolucionaria (1995-2014), La Hoja del Norte, Caracas, 2015.
 La cocina de Jurassic Park y otros ensayos visuales. Polar Foundation, Caracas, 1998.
 Mirar Furtivo. National Culture Council. Art and Critique Collection, Caracas, 1997.
 La década impensable y otros escritos fechados. Museo Jacobo Borges, Caracas, 1996.
 Armando Reverón. De los prodigios de la luz a los trabajos del arte. Museo de Arte Contemporáneo Sofía Imber, Caracas, 1990.

Catalogues (A selection)
 Joaquín Torres-García. The Arcadian Modern, The Museum of Modern Art, New York, 2015
 Lygia Clark. The Abandonment of Art (Co-authored with Cornelia Butler), The Museum of Modern Art, New York, 2014
 Catalogo Trigésima Bienal de São Paulo: A Inminência das Poéticas, Fundaçao Bienal de São Paulo, São Paulo, 2012
 Tangled Alphabets, León Ferrari and Mira Schendel, The Museum of Modern Art, New York, 2009
 An Atlas of Drawings, Transforming Chronologies, The Museum of Modern Art, New York, 2006
 Armando Reverón. El lugar de los objetos, Galería de Arte Nacional, Caracas, 2001

Anthologies
Gina Saraceni: En-Obra. Antología de la poesía venezolana 1983-2008, Caracas: Equinoccio-Universidad Simón Bolívar, 2008.
Enrique Andrés Ruiz: Las dos hermanas. Antología de la poesía española e hispanoamericana del siglo XX sobre pintura, Madrid: Fondo de Cultura Económica de España, 2011
Syntaxis: una aventura creadora. 30 años del nacimiento de una revista, Santa Cruz de Tenerife: TEA, 2014

Awards 
Monteávila Poetry Award 1983.

References

Further reading 
 Jacques Leenhardt: Portrait. Luis Pérez-Oramas, Critique d'Art. The International Review of Contemporary Art Criticism, #41, Spring/Summer 2013, pp. 102–105.

1960 births
Living people
Art historians
Venezuelan curators
20th-century Venezuelan poets
21st-century Venezuelan poets
Venezuelan male poets
20th-century male writers
21st-century male writers